Samantha Louisa Ricketts (born December 29, 1986) is an American, former collegiate All-American, professional softball first basemen, and the current head coach at Mississippi State. She played college softball at Oklahoma, where she set the then career RBI record and was named a two-time Second Team NFCA All-American.

Playing career
Ricketts played college softball for Oklahoma from 2006 to 2009, where she set the then career RBI record and was named a two-time Second Team NFCA All-American.

Ricketts was drafted 12th overall by the Akron Racers in the 2009 NPF Draft, and played two seasons for the team.

Coaching career

Mississippi State
On July 21, 2014, Ricketts was named an assistant coach for Mississippi State. On July 30, 2018, she was promoted to associate head coach. On July 22, 2019, Ricketts was named the head coach for Mississippi State.

USSSA Pride
On May 25, 2016, Ricketts was named an assistant coach for the USSSA Pride of the National Pro Fastpitch league.

Personal life
Ricketts is the sister of softball athletes Keilani Ricketts and Stephanie Ricketts. She is of Samoan descent.

Statistics

Oklahoma Sooners

Head Coaching Record

College

References

External links
 

Living people
American softball coaches
American people of Samoan descent
Female sports coaches
Oklahoma Sooners softball players
Mississippi State Bulldogs softball coaches
Wichita State Shockers softball coaches
Oklahoma Sooners softball coaches
Sportspeople from San Jose, California
Softball players from California
Softball coaches from California
1986 births